Arhopala wanda is a butterfly in the family Lycaenidae. It was described by William Harry Evans in 1957. It is found in Wandesi, Western New Guinea.

References

Arhopala
Butterflies described in 1957
Butterflies of Oceania
Taxa named by William Harry Evans